Balli may refer to:

Places 
Ballı (literally "(place) with honey") is a Turkish place name that may refer to the following places in Turkey:

 Ballı, Ardanuç, a village in the district of Ardanuç, Artvin Province
 Ballı, Kahta, a village in the district of Kahta, Adıyaman Province
 , a village in the district of Malkara, Tekirdağ Province
 Ballı, Mut, a village in the district of Mut, Mersin Province
 Ballı, Erzincan

People 
 Balli Kalyanachakravarthy, an Indian politician
 Cecilia Ballí, an American journalist and anthropologist
 Daniele Balli, a former Italian footballer
 Harsharan Singh Balli, an Indian politician
 Padre Ballí, a rancher, a priest, and an original grantee
 Simone Balli, an Italian painter of the 17th century
 Veli Balli, a Turkish long-distance runner

Other uses
 Balli Dam, a dam under construction in Turkey
 Balli railway station
 Balli, an Albanian nationalist anti-communist resistance movement

See also
 Bali (disambiguation)